MyTravel Airways Limited was a British scheduled and charter airline with headquarters in Manchester, England. It operated worldwide holiday charter services mainly for its parent company, the MyTravel Group. The airline merged with Thomas Cook Airlines UK Limited in 2008 and was renamed Thomas Cook Airlines Limited.

The airline was founded in 1990 as Airtours International Airways and was to be the in-house airline for Airtours Holidays, (Going Places Travel Agent). In 1993 they purchased Inter European Airways and the fleet was merged. In 2002 Airtours changed their brand name to MyTravel and therefore Airtours International Airways became MyTravel Airways. During 2007 the MyTravel Group agreed to merge with Thomas Cook AG, and on 30 March 2008, MyTravel Airways was fully integrated into Thomas Cook Airlines.

MyTravel Airways A/S was the Danish sister airline of MyTravel Airways, which was re-branded Thomas Cook Airlines Scandinavia on 8 May 2008.

History
The Airtours tour operating company was founded by David Crossland and established its own in-house airline, Airtours International Airways, on 1 October 1990. It started operations on 11 March 1991 flying McDonnell Douglas MD-80 aircraft to destinations throughout Europe.

Cardiff-based Aspro Holidays and their inhouse airline, Inter European Airways, were acquired and integrated in November 1993 adding new aircraft types such as the Boeing 757 and Airbus A320 to the fleet. The MD83's were replaced in 1995–1996 with more Airbus A320s. In 1996 the parent company also acquired Danish charter airline Premiair. Airtours also had operations in Germany with airline FlyFTi, operating Airbus A320s until this was merged back into the UK fleet during 2003.

In the 1990s Airtours added long haul capabilities, with the addition of the Boeing 767 and McDonnell Douglas DC-10, flying holiday makers to destinations including the Caribbean and the United States. More Airbus aircraft joined the fleet during the 1990s with Airbus A320s, Airbus A321s and Airbus A330s accompanying the fleet of Boeing 757s, Boeing 767s and DC-10s. In 1995, the airline began offering pre-bookable seats, meal choices and duty-free on its flights – a practice that was subsequently adopted by many other UK charter airlines. The Airbus A330-200 aircraft delivered to Airtours in 1999 featured improved passenger amenities over older long haul aircraft and offered Premium Economy cabins in the form of Premiair Gold, something the Boeing 767 and DC-10 did not offer at the time. The Airbus A330-200's, operated by Thomas Cook for their long haul flights, were known for their unique cabin design. The special design forfeited several rows of seats in the middle of the plane for a steep staircase down to a lower partial deck, which incorporated a galley, three jumps seats, and 4 toilets.

On 27 January 2002, Airtours International became the first airline to use the new Swanwick Air Traffic Centre, as flight AIH550 from Las Palmas to Birmingham was handed over to the new facility.

Following the renaming of the Airtours Group to the MyTravel Group in February 2002, the Airtours International and Premiair operations were rebranded as MyTravel Airways with effect from 1 May 2002. In October 2002 MyTravel Airways launched its scheduled low-fare airline, MyTravelLite, but this was reintegrated in 2003.

In common with airlines worldwide, MyTravel Airways saw a reduction in customers due to the effects of the September 11, 2001 attacks. Official statistics from the United Kingdom Civil Aviation Authority (see reference below) indicated that the number of passengers carried by MyTravel Airways UK increased from 7.21 million in 2001 to 7.52 million in 2002. However, the figure dropped to 4.38 million in 2005, due to the number of aircraft being reduced from 45 in early 2001 to 29 in 2005, as part of the restructuring of the wider MyTravel Group.

In late 2004 the last of the McDonnell Douglas DC-10s and the last Boeing 757 were withdrawn from the fleet. MyTravel Airways was the last British airline to operate DC-10s. In December 2005, MyTravel Aircraft Engineering (MTAE) became a wholly owned subsidiary of the MyTravel Group, based at Manchester Airport. The facility performed all light maintenance checks (up to 'C' Check) for MyTravel Airways and MyTravel Airways A/S, as well as work for third party airlines such as Skyservice, and has now been re-branded Thomas Cook Airlines Engineering following the merger.

In late 2005, one of its Boeing 757-200s were used for the filming of American biographical film United 93, which was released a year later.
The original flight was flown by a 757.

MyTravel Aircraft Engineering Caribbean, part of MTAE had bases throughout the Caribbean in Cancún, Cozumel, Montego Bay, Newark, New Jersey and Sanford, Florida, as well as seasonal bases at various Spanish, Greek and Turkish airports as well as Jeddah for the Hajj operation. It handled more than 3500 aircraft for over 40 airlines a year. 

Due to necessary consolidation within the UK IT market, MyTravel Group PLC and Thomas Cook AG agreed to merge in March 2007 to form Thomas Cook Group PLC. Under the merger, MyTravel Airways and Thomas Cook Airlines fleets became one and the airlines became Thomas Cook Airlines, operating under MyTravel's AOC. Thomas Cook Airlines subsequently changed their callsign from 'Topjet' to MyTravel's callsign 'Kestrel'. MyTravel's last flight operated on 30 March 2008.

Destinations

Most flights were operated for MyTravel Group Tour Operators as MyTravel Airways was their in-house airline. Many routes to Canada were operated by MyTravel Airways on behalf of specialist Canadian Affair. It was the only British airline to fly to Djerba from Manchester Airport and Gatwick Airport. As of 2007, MyTravel Airways flew to the following destinations:

Africa
 Egypt
 Hurghada - Hurghada International Airport
 Luxor - Luxor International Airport
 Sharm El Sheikh - Sharm El Sheikh International Airport
 Kenya
 Mombasa - Moi International Airport
 Morocco
 Agadir - Agadir – Al Massira Airport
 Tunisia
 Djerba - Djerba–Zarzis International Airport
 Monastir - Monastir Habib Bourguiba International Airport

Americas
 Antigua and Barbuda
 Antigua - V. C. Bird International Airport
 Brazil
 Salvador de Bahia - Salvador International Airport
 Canada
 Toronto - Toronto Pearson International Airport
 Vancouver - Vancouver International Airport
 Barbados
 Bridgetown - Grantley Adams International Airport
 Cuba
 Varadero - Juan Gualberto Gómez Airport
 Dominican Republic
 Puerto Plata - Gregorio Luperón International Airport
 Punta Cana - Punta Cana International Airport
 Cayman Islands
 Grand Cayman - Owen Roberts International Airport
 Jamaica
 Montego Bay - Sangster International Airport
 Mexico
 Cancún - Cancún International Airport
 United States
 Las Vegas - McCarran International Airport
 Orlando - Orlando Sanford International Airport

Asia
 China
 Beijing - Beijing Capital International Airport
 Hong Kong - Hong Kong International Airport
 Sanya - Sanya Phoenix International Airport
 Shanghai - Shanghai Pudong International Airport
 Cyprus
 Larnaca - Larnaca International Airport
 Paphos - Paphos International Airport
 India
 Goa - Dabolim Airport
 Trivandrum - Trivandrum International Airport
 Japan
 Nagoya - Chubu Centrair International Airport
 Osaka - Kansai International Airport
 Tokyo - Narita International Airport
 Maldives
 Malé - Velana International Airport
 South Korea
 Seoul - Incheon International Airport
 Taiwan
 Taipei - Taiwan Taoyuan International Airport
 Turkey
 Antalya - Antalya Airport
 Bodrum - Milas–Bodrum Airport
 Dalaman - Dalaman Airport

Europe
 Austria
 Salzburg - Salzburg Airport
 Bulgaria
 Burgas - Burgas Airport
 Finland
 Kittilä - Kittilä Airport
 France
 Grenoble - Alpes–Isère Airport
 Greece
 Corfu - Corfu International Airport
 Heraklion - Heraklion International Airport
 Kalamata - Kalamata International Airport
 Kefalonia - Kefalonia International Airport
 Kos - Kos International Airport
 Rhodes - Rhodes International Airport
 Thessaloniki - Thessaloniki Airport
 Zakynthos - Zakynthos International Airport
 Italy
 Naples - Naples International Airport
 Olbia - Olbia Costa Smeralda Airport
 Rimini - Federico Fellini International Airport
 Malta
 Luqa - Malta International Airport
 Portugal
 Faro - Faro Airport
 Spain
 Alicante - Alicante–Elche Airport
 Almería - Almería Airport
 Fuerteventura - Fuerteventura Airport
 Girona - Girona–Costa Brava Airport
 Gran Canaria - Gran Canaria Airport
 Ibiza - Ibiza Airport
 Lanzarote - Lanzarote Airport
 Málaga - Málaga Airport
 Menorca - Menorca Airport
 Palma de Mallorca - Palma de Mallorca Airport
 Reus - Reus Airport
 Tenerife - Tenerife South Airport

Incidents
On 5 July 2007, a first officer who was not an employee but was paying MyTravel to gain flight experience on their aircraft (pay-to-fly) landed an Airbus A320 heavily at Kos airport in Greece, causing substantial damage to the main landing gear. The report was critical of both the pilot's training record and non-employees paying airlines to gain experience.

Fleet
Airtours was formed in 1990 and changed to MyTravel Airways in 2002 with the merger of Premiair. Since the formation of the airline as Airtours International Airways in 1990, until the merger with Thomas Cook in 2008,  MyTravel Airways has operated the following aircraft types:

Awards
MyTravel Airways achieved several punctuality awards between 2005 and 2007.
 FlightOnTime.info Most Punctual UK Charter Airline - Summer 2006, Summer 2007 & Winter 2007/08
 FlightOnTime.info Most Improved UK Charter Airline for Punctuality - Summer 2005 & Summer 2006
 CAA Air Transport Users Council – Most Punctual UK Charter Airline – Winter 2005/2006

See also
 List of defunct airlines of the United Kingdom

References 

 Civil Aviation Authority UK Airline Statistics for 2001 and 2005; total passengers carried by UK airlines. Table 0.1.6
 Air-Britain Airline Fleets 2001 London, 2001.  .
 Air-Britain Airline Fleets 2005 London, 2005.  .
 

Defunct airlines of the United Kingdom
Airlines established in 2002
Airlines disestablished in 2008
2002 establishments in the United Kingdom
2008 disestablishments in the United Kingdom